The 1951–52 season was the sixth season in FK Partizan's existence. This article shows player statistics and matches that the club played during the 1951–52 season.

Players

Squad information

Friendlies

Competitions

Yugoslav First League

Group 1

Central group

Yugoslav Cup

Statistics

Goalscorers 
This includes all competitive matches.

See also
 List of FK Partizan seasons

References

External links
 Official website
 Partizanopedia 1952  (in Serbian)

FK Partizan seasons
Partizan